Madoryx plutonius is a moth of the  family Sphingidae.

Distribution 
It is known from Suriname, Venezuela, French Guiana, Ecuador, Peru, Bolivia, Brazil, Argentina, Paraguay, Costa Rica Colombia and Guatemala. It is probably also present in Panama, and Guyana. Subspecies dentatus is found in Mexico and Belize.

Description 
The wingspan is 92–120 mm. It differs from all other Madoryx species in the acute forewing apex. There is a minute, circular, upper silver spot and an elongate, triangular lower silver spot on the forewing upperside.

Biology 
Adults are on wing year round.

The larvae have been recorded feeding on Conostegia xalapensis and found feeding on Yemeri (Vochysia hondurensis) in Belize. Pupation takes place in a loose cocoon of yellow silk and leaves. The pupa is dark chocolate brown.

Subspecies
Madoryx plutonius plutonius
Madoryx plutonius dentatus Gehlen, 1931 (Mexico Colombia and Belize)

References

Dilophonotini
Moths described in 1819